The London and North Western Railway Precedent Class was a class of seventy  steam locomotives originally designed for express passenger work.

History
They were designed by F. W. Webb and built by the LNWR's Crewe Works between 1874 and 1882. The numbering was haphazard – while the first twenty carried "new" numbers in a solid block, the remaining fifty carried numbers formerly carried by withdrawn locomotives. All seventy carried names from new, and many of these had been used on withdrawn locomotives.

Sixty-two of the locomotives were "renewed" (replaced with new locomotives carrying the same number and name) as Improved Precedent class locomotives between 1893 and 1901.

Two of the unrenewed locomotives were scrapped in 1907, two in the 1910s, with four passing to the London Midland and Scottish Railway in 1923. They were allocated numbers 5000–5003 and were withdrawn between 1929 and 1934; the last, 5001 Snowdon had 20000 added to its number six months before withdrawal in order to release its old number for an LMS Stanier Class 5 4-6-0.

Accidents and incidents
 The Ditton Junction rail crash. On 17 September 1912,  a late afternoon express train, packed with holidaymakers returning to Liverpool from Chester, hauled by Precedent class "Cook" left the rails just to the east of Ditton Junction railway station and crashed into the brickwork of the bridge that carried Hale Road over the railway. Thirteen passengers were killed.

On 7 December 1925, locomotive 1170 General ran through a set of level crossing gates and struck a bus at Fenny Stratford; nine bus passengers died.

Fleet list

References

Precendent
2-4-0 locomotives
Railway locomotives introduced in 1874
Standard gauge steam locomotives of Great Britain